The fear of ghosts in many human cultures is based on beliefs that some ghosts may be malevolent towards people and dangerous (within the range of all possible attitudes, including mischievous, benign, indifferent, etc.). It is related to fear of the dark. The fear of ghosts is a very common fear.

A persistent fear of ghosts is sometimes called phasmophobia, a type of specific phobia. It is often brought about by experiences in early childhood and causes sufferers to experience panic attacks.

Typical character
The fear of ghosts is widespread even in post-industrial societies. Philosopher Peter van Inwagen wrote:
"...I am perfectly aware that the fear of ghosts is contrary to science, reason and religion. If I were sentenced to spend a night alone in a graveyard, <...> I should already know that twigs would snap and the wind moan and that there would be half-seen movements in the darkness. And yet, after I had been frog-marched into the graveyard, I should feel a thrill of fear every time one of these things happened..."

In many traditional accounts, ghosts are often thought to be deceased people looking for vengeance, or imprisoned on earth for bad things they did during life. The appearance of a ghost has often been regarded as an omen or portent of death. Seeing one's own ghostly double or doppelgänger is a related omen of death.

Wari'
Wari', an Amazon rainforest tribe, believe that the spirits of dead people may appear as scaring specters called jima. The jima is said to grab a person with very strong, cold and poisonous hands and try to pull the person's spirit away.

Papuans
A 19th-century missionary describes the fear of ghosts among Papuans as follows:
"That a great fear
of ghosts prevails among the Papuans is intelligible. Even
by day they are reluctant to pass a grave, but nothing
would induce them to do so by night. For the dead
are then roaming about in their search for gambier and
tobacco, and they may also sail out to sea in a canoe.
Some of the departed, above all the so-called Mambrie or
heroes, inspire them with especial fear. In such cases for
some days after the burial you may hear about sunset a
simultaneous and horrible din in all the houses of all the
villages, a yelling, screaming, beating and throwing of sticks;
happily the uproar does not last long: its intention is to
compel the ghost to take himself off: they have given him
all that befits him, namely, a grave, a funeral banquet, and
funeral ornaments; and now they beseech him not to thrust
himself on their observation any more, not to breathe any
sickness upon the survivors, and not to kill them or "fetch"
them, as the Papuans put it."

Japanese
Onryō (怨霊) is a  Japanese ghost (yurei) who is able to return to the physical world in order to seek vengeance. While male onryō can be found, mainly in kabuki theatre, the majority are women, powerless in the physical world, they often suffer at the capricious whims of their male lovers. In death they become strong. Goryō are vengeance ghosts from the aristocratic classes, especially those who have been martyred.

Literature and arts
Fear of ghosts, their vengeance and mischief is a common base for a plot in the ghost story literary genre and in ghost movies.
In cartoons and comics, Casper's efforts to make friends is hampered by humans, animals and even inanimate objects irrationally panicking, screaming and running away at the sight of him.  It may be said that the characters Shaggy and Scooby from the TV and movie franchise Scooby-Doo suffer from phasmophobia, with the added joke that the ghosts they encountered were usually criminals masquerading as ghosts, specifically preying on people's phasmophobia as a cover for their criminal activities.

See also
 List of phobias

References

Ghosts
Phobias
Superstitions